Frank Corbett Welch (July 14, 1900 – September 3, 1986) was a Canadian exporter, farmer, horticulturist, and Senator.

Born Port Greville, Nova Scotia, he owned and operated his own fruit farm for forty years. He was also president of the Nova Scotia Progressive Conservative Association for ten years. He served on the town council of Wolfville, Nova Scotia for fifteen years and was deputy mayor for ten of them. In 1962, he was summoned to the Canadian senate representing the senatorial division of King's, Nova Scotia. A Progressive Conservative, he resigned on his 75th birthday in 1975.

References

External links
 

1900 births
1986 deaths
Canadian senators from Nova Scotia
Progressive Conservative Party of Canada senators